Tong Daning was a high-level government official in the People's Republic of China who was executed for espionage on 21 April 2006.

Tong held a number of senior roles in the Chinese civil service. He spent 15 years working at the Ministry of Foreign Affairs, and also held senior roles at the National Development and Reform Commission and the National Council for Social Security Fund, a multibillion-dollar national pension fund. The Beijing Intermediate Court found him guilty of selling state secrets to Taiwan, and he was sentenced to death. His execution occurred on April 21, 2006. Subsequently, recordings of his trial were shown to other Chinese civil servants in an effort to discourage espionage.
Tong was the most senior Chinese official to be executed for espionage since Major General Liu Liankun in 1999.

References

Taiwanese spies
Chinese spies
2006 deaths
1950 births
Manchu politicians
Politicians from Jinzhou
Executed spies
21st-century executions by China
People's Republic of China politicians from Liaoning
Executed People's Republic of China people